The Lilac Arboretum and Children's Forest, sometimes also known as the Ewing Lilac Arboretum, is located in Ewing Park at 5300 Indianola Avenue, Des Moines, Iowa.

The arboretum contains more than 1,400 lilac bushes representing 120 varieties.

See also
 List of botanical gardens in the United States

Arboreta in Iowa
Botanical gardens in Iowa
Geography of Des Moines, Iowa
Tourist attractions in Des Moines, Iowa
Protected areas of Polk County, Iowa